Dłużyna Dolna  is a village in the administrative district of Gmina Pieńsk, within Zgorzelec County, Lower Silesian Voivodeship, in south-western Poland, close to the German border.

The village has a population of 900.

Gallery

References

Villages in Zgorzelec County